The Rong River, (Chinese: 榕江, tr. Róngjiāng) commonly referred to as the South River (南河, tr. nánhé), formerly known as the Jieyang River (揭阳江, tr. jiēyángjiāng) is located in Guangdong Province of the People's Republic of China and is the second longest river on the eastern coast of Guangdong. It is named for the many Banyan trees (róngshù) in the city of Jieyang. It rises in the southern foothills of Phoenix Mountain in Luhe County and flows northeast through the towns of Dongkeng and Shuichun, in Jiexi County the towns of Wuyun, Hepo, Daxi, and Qiankeng, in Puning the town of Lihu, then again in Jiexi the towns of Mianhu and Fengjiang, Jieyang city, and finally empties into the South China Sea at Shantou. The river is 196 km long with a drainage basin area of 4650 km2 and an average annual discharge of 6.1 billion m3. Typhoons, flooding, waterlogging, and droughts are all common along the Rong River basin.

References 

Rivers of Guangdong